The 6th season of Taniec z Gwiazdami, the Polish edition of Dancing With the Stars, started on 9 September 2007 and ended on 25 November 2007. It was broadcast by TVN. Katarzyna Skrzynecka and new presenter Piotr Gąsowski were the hosts, and the judges were: Iwona Szymańska-Pavlović, Zbigniew Wodecki, Beata Tyszkiewicz and Piotr Galiński.

Couples

Scores

Red numbers indicate the lowest score for each week.
Green numbers indicate the highest score for each week.
 indicates the couple eliminated that week.
 indicates the returning couple that finished in the bottom two.
 indicates the winning couple of the week.
 indicates the runner-up of the week.
 indicates the third place couple of the week.
 indicates the couple withdrew from the competition.
 indicates the couple that would have been eliminated had an elimination taken place.

Notes:

Week 1: Only male celebrities' dances were judged in this episode. Female celebrities danced a group Mambo. Mateusz Damięcki scored 33 out of 40 for his Waltz, making it the highest score in this episode. Adam Fidusiewicz got 21 points for his Cha-cha-cha, making it the lowest score of the week and this season. Tomasz & Amy were eliminated according to a combined jury and audience voting, but Jacek & Dominika left the show because of Jacek's injury, putting Tomasz & Amy back into the competition. It was the first time in history of the show the person left the show.

Week 2: Only female celebrities' dances were judged in this episode. Male celebrities danced a group Swing. Justyna Steczkowska scored 37 out of 40 for her Rumba, making it the highest Week 2 score in history of the show. Isis Gee got 25 points for her Rumba, making it the lowest score of the week. Sandra & Michał were eliminated despite being 3 points from the bottom.

Week 3: Mateusz Damięcki received the first perfect score of the season as well as the earliest perfect score in history of the show. Isis Gee and Jacek Kawalec got 27 points, making it the lowest score of the week. Tomasz & Amy were eliminated despite being 2 points from the bottom.

Week 4: Mateusz Damięcki and Anna Guzik scored 35 out of 40, making it the highest score in this episode. Rafał Bryndal got 22 points for his Paso Doble, making it the lowest score of the week. Halina Mlynkova announced her withdrawal from the show due to injury. Adam & Aleysa were eliminated despite being 2 points from the bottom. This week marks the first time in history of the show when two celebrities withdrew from the show. Also two celebrities left the show for the first time in history of the show.

Week 5: Mateusz Damięcki and Justyna Steczkowska scored 38 out of 40, making it the highest score in this episode. Rafał Bryndal got 22 points for his Viennese Waltz, making it the lowest score of the week. Helena & Milan were eliminated despite being 8 points from the bottom.

Week 6: Justyna Steczkowska received her first perfect score for the American Smooth. Krzysztof Bosak got 30 points for his Samba, making it the lowest score of the week. Krzysztof & Kamila were eliminated.

Week 7: Rafał Bryndal received his first perfect score for the Quickstep and Mateusz Damięcki received his second perfect score for the Quickstep. Jacek Kawalec got 27 points for his Quickstep, making it the lowest score of the week. Daria & Robert were eliminated despite being 3 points from the bottom.

Week 8: Justyna Steczkowska received her second perfect score for the Tango. Isis Gee got 25 points for her Tango, making it the lowest score of the week. Jacek & Blanka were eliminated despite being 3 points from the bottom.

Week 9: All couples danced to the most famous songs of Agnieszka Osiecka. Justyna Steczkowska received her third perfect score for the Paso Doble. Isis Gee and Rafał Bryndal got 30 points, making it the lowest score of the week. Isis & Żora were eliminated.

Week 10: All couples danced two dances. Mateusz Damięcki got two perfect scores for his Jive and American Smooth. Rafał & Magdalena were eliminated.

Week 11: Anna Guzik received her first perfect score for the Argentine Tango, Justyna Steczkowska received her 4th perfect score for the Cha-cha-cha and Mateusz Damięcki received his 5th perfect score for the Argentine Tango. Mateusz & Ewa were eliminated despite being 10 points from the bottom.

Week 12: Both couples had to perform three dances: their favorite Latin dance, their favorite Ballroom dance and a Freestyle. Justyna Steczkowska received her 5th, 6th and 7th perfect score for the Cha-cha-cha, American Smooth and Freestyle. Steczkowska got 120 out of 120 points, making it the second person getting the highest possible score in the finale. Anna Guzik received her second and third perfect score for the Tango and Freestyle. Guzik became the 6th winner in the history of the show, having cast 53.5 percent of the votes. This is the first time the season's winner was on the 4th place on the judges' general scoreboard and the second time the winner was not on the first place according to the judges' scoreboard.

Special Star

Average Chart

Episodes

Week 1
Individual judges scores in charts below (given in parentheses) are listed in this order from left to right: Ivona Pavlović, Zbigniew Wodecki, Beata Tyszkiewicz, Piotr Galiński.
Running order

Week 2Individual judges scores in charts below (given in parentheses) are listed in this order from left to right: Piotr Galiński, Beata Tyszkiewicz, Zbigniew Wodecki, Ivona Pavlović.Running order

Week 3Individual judges scores in charts below (given in parentheses) are listed in this order from left to right: Piotr Galiński, Beata Tyszkiewicz, Zbigniew Wodecki, Ivona Pavlović.Running order

Week 4Individual judges scores in charts below (given in parentheses) are listed in this order from left to right: Piotr Galiński, Beata Tyszkiewicz, Zbigniew Wodecki, Ivona Pavlović.Running order

Week 5Individual judges scores in charts below (given in parentheses) are listed in this order from left to right: Piotr Galiński, Beata Tyszkiewicz, Zbigniew Wodecki, Ivona Pavlović.Running order

Week 6Individual judges scores in charts below (given in parentheses) are listed in this order from left to right: Piotr Galiński, Beata Tyszkiewicz, Zbigniew Wodecki, Ivona Pavlović.Running order

Week 7Individual judges scores in charts below (given in parentheses) are listed in this order from left to right: Piotr Galiński, Beata Tyszkiewicz, Zbigniew Wodecki, Ivona Pavlović.Running order

Week 8Individual judges scores in charts below (given in parentheses) are listed in this order from left to right: Piotr Galiński, Beata Tyszkiewicz, Zbigniew Wodecki, Ivona Pavlović.Running order

Week 9: Agnieszka Osiecka WeekIndividual judges scores in charts below (given in parentheses) are listed in this order from left to right: Piotr Galiński, Beata Tyszkiewicz, Zbigniew Wodecki, Ivona Pavlović.Running order

Week 10Individual judges scores in charts below (given in parentheses) are listed in this order from left to right: Piotr Galiński, Beata Tyszkiewicz, Zbigniew Wodecki, Ivona Pavlović.Running order

Week 11Individual judges scores in charts below (given in parentheses) are listed in this order from left to right: Piotr Galiński, Beata Tyszkiewicz, Zbigniew Wodecki, Ivona Pavlović.Running order

Week 12: FinalIndividual judges scores in charts below (given in parentheses) are listed in this order from left to right: Piotr Galiński, Beata Tyszkiewicz, Zbigniew Wodecki, Ivona Pavlović.Running order

Other Dances

Dance Schedule
The celebrities and professional partners danced one of these routines for each corresponding week.
 Week 1: Cha-Cha-Cha or Waltz (Men) & Group Mambo (Women)
 Week 2: Rumba or Quickstep (Women) & Group Swing (Men)
 Week 3: Jive (Women) or Tango (Men)
 Week 4: Paso Doble (Men) or Foxtrot (Women)
 Week 5: Salsa (Women) or Viennese Waltz (Men)
 Week 6: Samba (Men) or American Smooth (Women)
 Week 7: Cha-Cha-Cha (Women) or Quickstep (Men)
 Week 8: Tango (Women) or Rumba (Men) & Group Freestyle
 Week 9: Paso Doble (Women) or Foxtrot (Men) & Group Viennese Waltz (Agnieszka Osiecka Week)
 Week 10: Waltz & Samba (Women) or Jive & American Smooth (Men)
 Week 11: Argentine Tango & Cha-Cha-Cha
 Week 12: Favourite Latin dance, favourite Ballroom dance & Freestyle

Dance Chart

 Highest scoring dance
 Lowest scoring dance
 Performed, but not scored
 Not performed due to withdrawal

Weekly results
The order is based on the judges' scores combined with the viewers' votes.

 This couple came in first place with the judges.
 This couple came in first place with the judges and gained the highest number of viewers' votes.
 This couple gained the highest number of viewers' votes.
 This couple came in last place with the judges and gained the highest number of viewers' votes.
 This couple came in last place with the judges.
 This couple came in last place with the judges and was eliminated.
 This couple was eliminated.
 This couple gained the highest number of viewers' votes and withdrew from the competition.
 This couple withdrew from the competition.
 This couple would have been eliminated but was not eliminated due to other couple's withdrawal.
 This couple won the competition.
 This couple came in second in the competition.
 This couple came in third in the competition.

Audience voting results

Rating Figures

References

External links
 Official Site - Taniec z gwiazdami
 Taniec z gwiazdami'' on Polish Wikipedia

Season 06
2007 Polish television seasons